The O'Moore Medal is awarded by the Healthcare Informatics Society of Ireland to individuals or organisations that have made a major contribution to Healthcare Informatics. The award is named after Professor Rory O'Moore, who received the award in 2003 when it was inaugurated by then Taoiseach Bertie Ahern.

Awards
 2003: Rory O'Moore
 2005: Georges De Moor
 2007: Jane Grimson
 2008: Glyn Hayes
 2009: H. Stephen Lieber
 2011: Kieran Hickey
 2018: Richard Corbridge (FBCS)

See also 

 List of computer science awards

References

External links
 

Information science awards
Awards established in 2003
Irish awards